Tsagveri is a  daba in Borjomi Municipality in the Samtskhe–Javakheti region of Georgia. The daba has a population of 799, as of 2014. Tsagveri is located on the northern slopes of the Trialeti Range, at 1020-1130 meters above sea level. It is a Balneological resort.  The resort comprises moderately mild, snowy winters and moderately warm summers.

References 

Populated places in Borjomi Municipality